Ampasikely is a town and commune in Madagascar. It belongs to the district of Ambatondrazaka, which is a part of Alaotra-Mangoro Region. The population of the commune was estimated to be approximately 6,995 in 2012.

It had become a village (Fokontany) in 1975. It borders in the north to Ambohimandroso, in the south to Ambodifarihy, in the east to Ambatomainty and Mahakary and in the west to Ampandriatsara and Amparihimaina.

Economy
It is based on agriculture. 70% of its inhabitants plant rice.

Ethnicities
 Merina - 60%
 Betsimisaraka - 20%
 Sihanaka - 15%
 Antandroy - 5%

Religion
85% are Christians, there are 4 churches in the town. 15% belong to traditional religion.

References and notes 

Populated places in Alaotra-Mangoro